Apple Workgroup Server and Macintosh Server are a family of Macintosh-based workgroup servers, sold by Apple Computer from 1993 to 2003. Machines bearing these names are re-branded Centris, Quadra and Power Macintosh systems with additional server software and sometimes larger hard drives. Apart from that, they were mostly identical to the machines they are based on. The "Workgroup Server" name was used until the release of the Power Macintosh G3 in 1998.

In 1996 and 1997, Apple also sold a separate range of machines marketed as the Apple Network Server, which were specially-designed servers that exclusively ran AIX and thus do not qualify as Macintosh computers.

The first models were the Workgroup Server 60, 80 and 95, introduced together at CeBIT in Hanover on March 22, 1993. Customer shipments of the 95 began in April, with the 60 and 80 following in July. New models were introduced every year except 1995, and remained on the market until 2003, several months after the rack-mounted Xserve was introduced.

List of models

Timeline

References

External links
Apple Workgroup Servers at EveryMac.com

Macintosh servers